United Nations Security Council Resolution 428, adopted unanimously on May 6, 1978, after hearing representations from the People's Republic of Angola, Zambia and the South West Africa People's Organisation (SWAPO), the Council reminded Member States to refrain from using threats and use of force in their international relations. Reiterating Resolution 387 (1976), the present resolution condemned South Africa for its armed invasion of Angola via South West Africa (Namibia).

Resolution 428 went on to condemn the suppression of the Namibian people by South Africa, as well as apartheid. The Council reaffirmed that the liberation of the Namibian people would be a prerequisite for the attainment of peace and security in southern Africa. The resolution also commended the People's Republic of Angola for its support of the Namibian people.

Finally, the Council made provisions that, should Angola be attacked again, it would not hesitate to adopt further measures against South Africa, in accordance with Chapter VII of the United Nations Charter.

See also
 List of United Nations Security Council Resolutions 401 to 500 (1976–1982)
 Namibian War of Independence
 South African Border Wars
 South Africa under apartheid
 Cassinga Raid

References
Text of the Resolution at undocs.org

External links
 

 0428
20th century in South Africa
1978 in Africa
Angola–South Africa relations
 0428
May 1978 events